Valdemar Lund Jensen (born 28 May 2003) is a Danish professional footballer who plays as a centre-back for F.C. Copenhagen.

Club career
Lund is a youth product of Sundby Boldklub, Tårnby, and F.C. Copenhagen where he was captain of their U19 team. He signed his first professional contract with Copenhagen on 20 December 2020, keeping him at the club until December 2023. He made his professional and Danish Superliga debut as a late substitute with Copenhagen in a 3–0 win over Vejle on 31 October 2021. On 12 August 2022, he scored his first senior goal in a 1-3 home loss to Randers.

Club

International career
Born in Denmark, Lund is of Polish descent. He is a youth international for Denmark, having played up to the Denmark U20s.

Playing style
Lund is a left-footed centre-back with great passing to start up plays, and with strong heading ability. He is physical and tactically astute, and good at initiating offensive plays.

Honours
Copenhagen
 Danish Superliga: 2021–22

References

External links
 
 DBU Profile
 FCK Profile

2003 births
Living people
People from Amager
Danish men's footballers
Denmark youth international footballers
Danish people of Polish descent
Association football defenders
F.C. Copenhagen players
Danish Superliga players